Blue for You is the ninth studio album by English rock band Status Quo. It was released in March 1976, and is the last album until 1980's Just Supposin' that they produced themselves, which resulted in subsequent albums having a noticeably lighter, more pop oriented sound.

Rick Parfitt's "Rain", the first single from the album, reached No. 7 in the UK charts after its release in February 1976. Its B-side was the non-album track "You Lost the Love", written by Francis Rossi and Bob Young.

The album was released the following month. It entered the British album chart at No. 1 and stayed there for three weeks, making it one of their most successful long players. It was released in the US with a different, black and silver cover, with the title not prominent on the record.

An edited version of Parfitt and Young's "Mystery Song", released in July that year, was the second single from the album, and peaked at No. 11 a few months later. Parfitt and Alan Lancaster's "Drifting Away", from their 1974 album Quo, served as the single's B-side.

In December that year the band decided to release a cover of "Wild Side of Life", a song made famous by Hank Thompson and His Brazos Valley Boys, and written by Arlie Carter and William Warren. Its B-side was a new Rossi/Lancaster composition, "All Through the Night". The single reached No. 9.

Track listing

2005 reissue bonus tracks 
 "You Lost the Love" (Rossi, Young)
 "Mystery Song [Single Version]" (Parfitt, Young) - 4:00
 "Wild Side of Life" (Arlie Carter, William Warren) - 3:17
 "All Through the Night" (Rossi, Lancaster)
 "Wild Side of Life [Demo Version]" (Carter, Warren)

2017 deluxe edition disc 2 
 "You Lost the Love" (Rossi, Young) - 3:01
 "Mystery Song [Single Version]" (Parfitt, Young) - 4:00
 "Wild Side of Life" (Arlie Carter, William Warren) - 3:17
 "All Through the Night" (Rossi, Lancaster) - 3:17
 "Wild Side of Life [Demo Version]" (Carter, Warren) - 3:52
 "Most of the Time [Live]" (Rossi, Young) - 3:20
 "Roadhouse Blues [Live]" (Morrison, Krieger, Densmore, Manzarek) - 12:47
 "Bye Bye Johnny [Live]" (Berry) - 6:37
 "Caroline [Live]" (Rossi, Young) - 4:36
 "In My Chair [Live]" (Rossi, Young) - 4:36
 "Roll Over Lay Down [Live]" (Rossi, Young, Parfitt, Lancaster, Coghlan) - 6:09
 "Is There a Better Way [Live]" (Rossi, Lancaster) - 3:43
 "Rain [Live]" (Parfitt) - 4:37
 "Honky Tonk Angel [Demo]" (Carter, Warren) - 3:51

Tracks 6 & 7 recorded live in Stoke 1975

Tracks 8-13 recorded live in Osaka 1976

Tracks 5 and 14 are the same recording

Personnel
Status Quo
 John Coghlan - drums
 Alan Lancaster - bass, guitar, vocals
 Rick Parfitt - guitar, keyboards, vocals
 Francis Rossi - guitar, vocals
with:
 Andy Bown - piano on "Mad About the Boy" and "Ease Your Mind"
 Bob Young - harmonica on "Rolling Home"

Chart positions

Weekly charts

Year-end charts

Certifications

References 

Status Quo (band) albums
1976 albums
Capitol Records albums
Vertigo Records albums